Robert Berkeley  was an Anglican priest in Ireland, most notably Dean of Clogher from 1617 until his death in 1654.

Berkeley was ordained in 1606. and became Vicar of Donagh in 1617 and of Clogher in 1635.

References

17th-century Irish Anglican priests
1654 deaths
Deans of Clogher
Year of birth missing